Cumbum railway station (station code:CBM), is a D-category Indian Railways station in the Guntur railway division of the South Central Railway zone. It is situated on the Nallapadu–Nandyal section and provides rail connectivity to the town of Cumbum. This railway station is used by residents of Cumbum, Bestavaripeta, Ardhaveedu, and Kanigiri. Trains from this station run to Nandyal, Hubli, Goa, Bengaluru, Hyderabad, Vijayawada, Visakhapatnam, Bhuvaneswar, and Kolkata. The railway passes by the historic Cumbum Tank starting from the Cumbum railway station for a distance of about 7 km. It passes through one of the most picturesque valleys in the Guntur–Nandyal section of the South Central Railway.

References 

Railway stations in Prakasam district